Vice-Admiral Thomas Butler, 6th Earl of Ossory, KG, PC, PC (Ire) (1634–1680) was an Irish soldier and politician. He was the eldest son of James Butler, 1st Duke of Ormond but predeceased his father and therefore never succeeded as duke.

Birth and origins 
Thomas was born on 8 July 1634, at Kilkenny Castle. He was the eldest son of James Butler and his wife Elizabeth Preston. His father was then the 12th Earl of Ormond but would be raised to marquess and duke. His family, the Butler dynasty, is Old English and descends from Theobald Walter, who had been appointed Chief Butler of Ireland by King Henry II in 1177.

Thomas's mother was a second cousin once removed of his father as she was a granddaughter of Black Tom, the 10th Earl of Ormond. Her father, however, was Scottish, Richard Preston, 1st Earl of Desmond, a favourite of James I. Both parents were Protestants. They had married on Christmas Day 1629.

He had three surviving brothers and two sisters, who are listed in his father's article.

Early life 
As the eldest living son, he was the heir apparent and was styled with the corresponding courtesy title, which initially was Viscount Thurles but changed to Earl of Ossory when his father became marquess in 1642. Ossory, as he was after 1642, continued to live with his family in Ireland  until 1647 when his father abandoned Dublin to the parliamentarians and Ossory accompanied his father to England. In 1648 his father renewed his support for the royalist cause and Ossory fled with his father to France, arriving in Caen, Normandy, in February 1648. Ossory's mother also moved to Caen, where she arrived on 23 June 1648 with his siblings. Ossory was educated at a school in Caen and was an accomplished athlete and a good scholar.

However the family soon ran into financial problems. In 1652 when Cromwell had completed the conquest of Ireland, his mother brought Ossory and his sibling to London where she obtained a pension of £2000 per year from the income from her Irish estates under the condition that none of that money would be passed on to her husband. In 1655 Ossory was rightly suspected of sympathising with the exiled royalists, and was jailed by Oliver Cromwell. After his release about a year later he went into exile to the Netherlands where Charles II had his exile court at the time.

Marriage and children 
On 17 November 1659, while in exile in the Netherlands, Ossory married Emilia van Nassau, the second daughter of Louis of Nassau, Lord of De Lek and Beverweerd.

 
Thomas and Emilia had eleven children, including two sons:
 James (1665–1745), became the 2nd Duke of Ormonde in 1688
 Charles (1671–1758), became the de jure 3rd Duke of Ormonde, following his elder brother's attainder in 1715

—and three daughters:
 Elizabeth (died 1717), married William Stanley, 9th Earl of Derby in 1673
 Amelia (died 1760), inherited the estates of her brother Charles and never married
 Henrietta (died 1724), married Henry de Nassau d'Auverquerque, 1st Earl of Grantham

Later life 
In 1660 at the restauration, Ossory accompanied Charles II back to England. That same year he was appointed Lord of the Bedchamber to Charles II, a post he held until his death. Emilia was naturalised as English by Act of Parliament.

In 1661 Ossory became a MP for Bristol in the English and for Dublin University in the Irish house of commons.

In 1662 Ossory was called to the Irish House of Lords under a writ of acceleration as Earl of Ossory. His father had held the title "5th Earl of Ossory" as one of his subsidiary titles. The acceleration made Thomas Butler the 6th Earl of Ossory.

In 1665 Ossory was appointed lieutenant-general in the Irish army. In 1665 during the Second Anglo-Dutch War (1665–1667), a fortunate accident allowed Ossory to take part in the Battle of Lowestoft against the Dutch.

He was created an English peer as Baron Butler of Moore Park by being summoned to the English House of Lords by a writ on 17 September 1666. Almost as soon as he appeared in the House of Lords he was imprisoned for two days for challenging the Duke of Buckingham

He acted as deputy for his father, who was lord-lieutenant of Ireland, and in parliament he defended Ormond's Irish administration with great vigour. 

On 12 March 1672 he attacked the Dutch Smyrna fleet with the HMS Resolution, starting the Third Anglo-Dutch War (1672–1674) in an action that he is said to have greatly regretted later in life. 

In May 1672 he fought against the same enemies in the Battle of Solebay, serving with great distinction on both occasions. 

While visiting France in 1672, he rejected the liberal offers made by Louis XIV to induce him to enter the service of France.

In August 1673 he added to his high reputation by his conduct during the Battle of Texel in August 1673. From 1677 until 1679, he served alongside his father as a Lord of the Admiralty.

Ossory was intimate with William, Prince of Orange, and in 1677 he joined the allied army in the Netherlands, commanding the British contingent and excelling at the siege of Mons in 1678. 

In 1680 he was appointed governor of English Tangier, but his death prevented him from taking up his new duties.

Death, succession, and timeline 
Ossory died on 30 July 1680 at Arlington House in London. He was buried provisionally in Westminster Abbey on 31 July 1680. The ceremony of burial was performed belatedly on 13 November 1680. Some say Ossory's body was later taken to Ireland and reburied in the family vault in St Canice's Cathedral, Kilkenny. James, his eldest son, succeeded him as the 7th Earl of Ossory and would in 1688 become the 2nd Duke of Ormond.

Notes and references

Notes

Citations

Sources 

 
 
 
  – 1643 to 1660
  – Marriages, baptisms and burials from about 1660 to 1875
 
  – N to R (for Ossory under Ormond)
  – Ab-Adam to Basing (for Arran)
  – Bass to Canning (for Butler of Moore Park)
 
  – England (for his daughter Elizabeth, cited here because the corresponding page is missing in the 1828 edition.)
  – Scotland and Ireland
 
  – 1665 to 1706
  – (for timeline)
  (for the subject as MP)
  – Viscounts
 
 

 
}

1634 births
1680 deaths
Burials at Westminster Abbey
Thomas
Earls in the Peerage of Ireland
English MPs 1661–1679
Governors of Tangier
Heirs apparent who never acceded
Irish soldiers
Irish colonial officials
Knights of the Garter
Lords Lieutenant of Ireland
Lords of the Admiralty
Members of the Privy Council of England
Members of the Privy Council of Ireland